The Prometheus Design is a Star Trek: The Original Series novel written by Sondra Marshak and Myrna Culbreath.

Plot
The U.S.S. Enterprise arrives to assist the Helvans, who are being plagued with outbreaks of many types of violence. Soon Captain Kirk becomes mentally ill. He is removed from command and Commander Spock takes over, but it is not exactly an improvement. Spock's orders seem to be just as irrational and cruel.

References

External links 
 

1982 American novels
1982 science fiction novels
American science fiction novels
Books by Myrna Culbreath
Books by Sondra Marshak
Novels based on Star Trek: The Original Series
Pocket Books books